Yaroslav Volodymyrovych Yanushevych (born 7 February 1978) is a Ukrainian politician who served as the governor of Kherson Oblast from 3 August 2022 until 24 January 2023.

Notes

References 

Ukrainian politicians
Ukrainian economists
Governors of Kherson Oblast
1978 births
Living people
Politicians from Kyiv
Taras Shevchenko National University of Kyiv alumni
Odesa University alumni
National Academy of State Administration alumni
Recipients of the Order of Merit (Ukraine), 1st class
Recipients of the Order of Merit (Ukraine), 2nd class
Recipients of the Order of Merit (Ukraine), 3rd class